Randall Creek Recreation Area is a South Dakota state recreation area in Gregory County, South Dakota in the United States. The area is open for year-round recreation including camping, swimming, fishing, hiking and boating.

See also
Fort Randall
List of South Dakota state parks

References

External links
 Randall Creek Recreation Area - SD Game, Fish, and Parks
 Ft. Randall Dam - U.S. Army Corps of Engineers

Protected areas of Gregory County, South Dakota
Protected areas of South Dakota
State parks of South Dakota